Norway competed at the 2020 Winter Youth Olympics in Lausanne, Switzerland from 9 to 22 January 2020.

Medalists

Alpine skiing

Boys

Girls

Biathlon

Boys

Girls

Mixed

Curling

Norway qualified a mixed team of four athletes.
Mixed team

Mixed doubles

Ice hockey

Speed skating

One Norwegian skater achieved quota place for Norway based on the results of the 2019 World Junior Speed Skating Championships.

Girls

See also
Norway at the 2020 Summer Olympics

References

2020 in Norwegian sport
Nations at the 2020 Winter Youth Olympics
Norway at the Youth Olympics